David Wilson Galloway (6 May 1905 – 1979) was a Scottish footballer who played at inside-left for Raith Rovers, Aberdeen, Preston North End, Port Vale, Carlisle United, Clapton Orient, and Tunbridge Wells Rangers.

Career
Galloway played for Wellesley Juniors and Raith Rovers, before featuring 14 times in the First Division for Aberdeen in the 1931–32 season. He then left the Pittodrie Stadium and moved south to join English Football League club Preston North End. He transferred to Port Vale in June 1934. After starting as a regular for the 1934–35 season, he lost his place in October 1934 and was released at the end of the season with just 12 Second Division appearances to his name at The Old Recreation Ground. He moved on to Carlisle United, Clapton Orient, and Tunbridge Wells Rangers.

Career statistics
Source:

References

Footballers from Kirkcaldy
Scottish footballers
Association football forwards
Raith Rovers F.C. players
Aberdeen F.C. players
Preston North End F.C. players
Port Vale F.C. players
Carlisle United F.C. players
Leyton Orient F.C. players
Tunbridge Wells F.C. players
Scottish Football League players
English Football League players
1905 births
1979 deaths
Scottish Junior Football Association players
Wellesley Juniors F.C. players